The Daylight Speedliner was an American named passenger train of the Baltimore and Ohio Railroad (B&O) in the 1950s and early 1960s. Equipped with three or four streamlined, self-propelled Budd Rail Diesel Cars (RDCs) coupled together, it initially operated between Philadelphia, Pennsylvania and Pittsburgh, Pennsylvania, via Baltimore, Maryland, and Washington, D. C., as Trains #21–22.

The B&O had been using RDCs in local Baltimore–Washington, D.C., commuter service since 1950. Pleased with their reliability and lower operating costs compared to heavyweight passenger trains drawn by steam locomotives, the B&O decided in 1955 to replace its money-losing Washingtonian steam train with RDCs, ordering four RDC-1s with reclining coach seats and two RDC-2s with baggage compartments. The RDC-equipped Daylight Speedliner entered service on October 28, 1956, and reduced the railroad's operating expenses by almost half, compared to the Washingtonian train it replaced.

After B&O discontinued passenger service north of Baltimore on April 26, 1958, the Daylight Speedliner operated between Baltimore and Pittsburgh, covering the  route on a seven-hour schedule, until its discontinuation on January 21, 1963.

Stations

Schedule and equipment
In 1961, the westbound Daylight Speedliner, operating as B&O's Train # 21, departed Baltimore at 9:00 a.m. and then Washington, D.C., at 10:00 a.m., arriving in Pittsburgh at 4:20 p.m. on the following schedule (principal stops shown in blue): 

Unusual for RDCs, the lead RDC-2 car was configured by B&O as a combination dining car/baggage car/coach (pictured) offering full meal service, with the addition of a kitchen and six tables, listed in B&O's 1961 time table as a "refreshment diner". Two of these unique cars were built for the service; both survive today. One is on display at the B&O Railroad Museum in Baltimore, Md; the other is at the Danbury Railway Museum in Danbury, Conn.

References

Named passenger trains of the United States
Passenger trains of the Baltimore and Ohio Railroad
Transportation in Baltimore
Transportation in Pittsburgh
Railway services introduced in 1956
Railway services discontinued in 1963